Hunderman or Hundarmaan or Hundurmaan is one of the northernmost hamlets in India and is situated in the Kargil district of Ladakh. Located on the banks of the Suru River 10 km from Kargil, it is a hamlet under  Shilikchey village of Kargil district.] It was under Pakistan's control until 1971. Geographically, Hunderman lies in the Baltistan Region. There are two parts of Hunderman: Lower Hunderman Mal (lower village) and Hunderman Broq (hill village).

History

Indo-Pakistan conflicts 
At the end of the Indo-Pakistani War of 1947, Hunderman came under the control of Pakistan. The Indian Army captured Hunderman after the Indo-Pakistani War of 1971.

Attractions

Hunderman–Museum of Memories, founded by the Roots Collective and Farside Collective (Leh).

Demographics 

According to the 2011 census of India, Hunderman has a population of about 216.

Transport

Road
Hunderman is connected by road to other places in Ladakh and India by the Srinagar-Leh Highway or the NH 1 and the LOC View Point Road.

Rail
The nearest railway stations are Baramulla railway station, Sopore railway station and Srinagar railway station, 227 kilometres, 222 kilometres and 229 kilometres away respectively.

Air
The nearest airport is at Kargil, 18 kilometres away, but it is currently non-operational. The next nearest major airport is Leh Airport 225 kilometres away.

See also
Ladakh
Indo-Pakistani War of 1971
Dras War Memorial
Farside Collective, art space, photobook store and publishers based in Leh

References

Further reading
 Hunderman, the portrait village on the India-Pak border, Livemint, 11 August 2017.
 https://www.farsidecollective.com

Villages in Kargil tehsil